Dylan Stevenson (born 17 February 1997) is a Scottish professional footballer who plays as a midfielder.

He started his career with Greenock Morton and had loan spells with Berwick Rangers and Dalry Thistle. He moved permanently to the Junior game in 2016 when he transferred from Morton to Auchinleck Talbot, and then back to Dalry from where he also had a loan spell at Largs Thistle.

Career
Before joining Morton, Stevenson played for Ayrshire youth side TASS Rovers.

Before making his debut for Morton, Stevenson joined Dalry Thistle on loan. After a couple of substitute appearances in the cups, Stevenson made his league debut against Hibernian on 15 August 2015 as a late replacement for Mark Russell. With the development league in its winter shutdown, Stevenson went on a development loan to Berwick Rangers in December 2015. He signed a six-month deal at Morton in May 2016.

In August 2016, he left Morton by mutual consent to join Auchinleck Talbot.

He moved back to Dalry Thistle for a season before signing with Troon in 2018, after a brief loan spell at Largs Thistle.

Personal life
Stevenson attended Garnock Academy.

Honours
Morton
SPFL Development League West: Winners 2015-16

Auchinleck Talbot
Scottish Junior Cup: Runners-up 2016-17

Dalry Thistle
Scottish Junior Football Ayrshire Division One: Winners 2017-18

See also
Greenock Morton F.C. season 2015–16

References

External links

1997 births
Living people
Footballers from Paisley, Renfrewshire
Greenock Morton F.C. players
Association football midfielders
Scottish footballers
Scottish Professional Football League players
Ayr United F.C. players
Scottish Junior Football Association players
Dalry Thistle F.C. players
Berwick Rangers F.C. players
Auchinleck Talbot F.C. players
Troon F.C. players
Largs Thistle F.C. players